James Kwesi Appiah (born 30 June 1960), also known as Akwasi Appiah, is a Ghanaian football coach and former player who played as a left back. He is currently the head coach of Kenpong Football Academy.

Early life and education 
Appiah was born on 30 June 1960 in Kumasi. He attended Opoku Ware School (OWASS) for his secondary school education.

Club career
Appiah, a left back, played club football for Prestea Mine Stars between 1982 and 1983, before joining Asante Kotoko, playing for them between 1983 and 1993.

International career 
Appiah played for the Ghana national team between 1982 and 1992, appearing in two FIFA World Cup qualifying matches; he also captained the team. Appiah was part of the 1982 squad that won the 1982 African Cup of Nations.

Coaching career
Between 1992 and 1995 Appiah served as the assistant coach for his former club Asante Kotoko including deputizing under Malik Jabir. He was subsequently promoted to serve in the role of head coach from 1995 to 1996. He served as a coach as part of the technical team of Fred Osam-Duodu when he served as Head coach of the Ghana national team from 2000 to 2001.

He has received technical training from English clubs Manchester City, and Liverpool.

James Kwesi Appiah was Ghana's assistant coach between 2007 and 2012 serving under Claude Le Roy and Milovan Rajevac.

Appiah was coach of Ghana U23 as they won the 2011 All-Africa Games.

He was appointed as the Head coach of the Ghana national team in April 2012, describing himself as "the underdog" in the process. His Ghana team qualified for the 2014 World Cup in Brazil, making him the first black African coach to take the country to the World Cup. He was given a new two-year contract in May 2014. After the country exited the World Cup in the group stages, Appiah defended his team. He left his position as Ghana manager by mutual consent in September 2014.

He became manager of Sudanese club Al Khartoum in December 2014.  During his first season, he led the team to a fourth place finish and qualification to the Confederation Cup. The following season, he led the club in attaining the highest points tally per season in the club’s history, 65 points, however they did not qualify for the CAF Confederation Cup.

In April 2017 he was re-appointed as the coach of the Ghana national team, replacing former Chelsea manager Avram Grant. He was sacked in January 2020.

In July 2021, he was appointed as the head coach of Kenpong Football Academy.

In January 2023 he was linked with the manager's job at Tanzanian club Simba SC. He also applied to become Ghana national team manager.

Honours

Player 
Asante Kotoko
 Ghana Premier League: 1983, 1986, 1987, 1988–89, 1990–91, 1991–92, 1992–93
 Ghanaian FA Cup: 1984, 1989–90
 African Cup of Champions Clubs: 1983
Ghana
 African Cup of Nations: 1982

Manager 
Ghana U23
 All-Africa Games: 2011
Individual
 Millennium Excellence Awards – Sports Category: 2021
 SWAG Sports Personality of the Year: 2014
 SWAG Coach of the Year: 2012

References

1960 births
Living people
Ghanaian footballers
Ghana international footballers
Ghanaian football managers
Ghana national football team managers
2014 FIFA World Cup managers
Ghanaian expatriate football managers
Ghanaian expatriate sportspeople in Sudan
Expatriate football managers in Sudan
2013 Africa Cup of Nations managers
1992 African Cup of Nations players
Footballers from Kumasi
Association football fullbacks
2019 Africa Cup of Nations managers
Alumni of Opoku Ware School
Association football coaches